Hannes Käsbauer (born 19 October 1986) is a German male badminton player. In 2011, he won bronze medal at the German National Badminton Championships in men's doubles event with Peter Käsbauer. In 2012, he became the runner-up of Slovenia International tournament in mixed doubles event with Kira Kattenbeck.

References

External links
 

1986 births
Living people
People from Weiden in der Oberpfalz
Sportspeople from the Upper Palatinate
German male badminton players